Sangar Nader (also Romanized as Sangar Nāder and Sangar-e Nāder; also known as Sangat-e Nāder) is a village in Anaran Rural District, in the Central District of Dehloran County, Ilam Province, Iran. At the 2006 census, its population was 28, in 5 families. The village is populated by Lurs.

References 

Populated places in Dehloran County
Luri settlements in Ilam Province